Currently, BGN and PCGN romanize the Korean language using two systems:
 McCune–Reischauer in North Korea (BGN 1943, with PCGN soon to follow);
 Revised Romanization of Korean in South Korea (2011 agreement).

Korean
Romanization of Korean